The Miguel Young Theatre is a theatre located in the city of Fray Bentos, Uruguay. 

Built in 1913 with plans of Antonio Llambías de Olivar. In 2012 it was refurbished in time to celebrate its centennial.

References

External links

 Blog

Fray Bentos
Theatres in Uruguay
Concert halls in Uruguay
Buildings and structures in Río Negro Department
Theatres completed in 1913
1913 establishments in Uruguay